Wąsochy  is a former settlement in the administrative district of Gmina Kępice, within Słupsk County, Pomeranian Voivodeship, in northern Poland.

For the history of the region, see History of Pomerania.

References

Villages in Słupsk County